The Beautiful was an American rock band from New York City.

History
With a line-up that consisted of Jonathan Lacey (vocals, guitar), Perry Bottke (bass), and Frank Ferrer (drums), the Beautiful signed to Warner Bros. subsidiary Giant Records, the group issued a pair of releases—a five-song, self-titled EP in September 1990, and a full-length album, Storybook, in May 1992. The group received some media coverage, including a feature article in Rip Magazine and a video clip for the song "John Doe" being aired on the Headbangers Ball program on MTV, but by 1993, the group split up.

Since 2006, Frank Ferrer has been a member of Guns N' Roses (replacing Bryan Mantia)—supplying drums on the songs "Chinese Democracy", "Better", "If the World", "There Was a Time" and "I.R.S." on their 2008 album, Chinese Democracy, and touring throughout the world with the band. After the Beautiful and prior to joining Guns N' Roses, Ferrer also played drums for a variety of acts, including The Psychedelic Furs, Perry Farrell, Wyclef Jean and Tool, among others.

The musical style of the Beautiful has been described as "A mix of Jane's Addiction at their most wistful and the broody flowery sway of Saigon Kick. Ultra-cool without having to try, it manages to glint but always remain exquisite from a far and is happy to lace its edges with darkness."

In 2012, Lacey gave this update about what he and his former band mates were up to via a posting on YouTube: "The three of us sunk our lives into the band. Many many miles in that Ford Econoline van. Frank is in Guns N' Roses now, Perry is a proud and wonderful father of a very accomplished cellist and I am fronting a RnB party/show band. Still singin about the dangers of powders and women! Check out the Johnny Tone fan page on FB. It ain't the Beautiful but I ain't 25 either. Thank you for the views and kind words. It means a lot. J H L"

In March 2014, an official Facebook page for the band was launched.

Later in 2014, Storybook came in at number two on a "Top 10 Underrated 90's Alternative Rock Albums" list at the Alternative Nation website.

Ferrer has remained a member of Guns N' Roses—including being part of the group's Not in This Lifetime... Tour, which saw Axl Rose reunite with original members Slash and Duff McKagan.

Discography
The Beautiful (1990)
Storybook (1992)

References

External links

Musical groups established in 1988
Musical groups disestablished in 1993
American alternative metal musical groups
Giant Records (Warner) artists
Musical groups from New York City